The Anglican Church of St Peter & St Paul in Churchstanton, Somerset, England dates from the 14th century and has been designated as a Grade I listed building.

Restoration work was carried out in 1719 and in 1830 a west gallery was added. The rood screen was added in 1910.

The church consists of a four-bay nave and a chancel which is at an angle to the nave and has a waggon roof.

Within the church are a Norman or Romanesque font and Jacobean pulpit. The font has a Hamstone square bowl which is supported by columns of Purbeck Marble.

The parish is part of the Blackdown benefice which is within the Diocese of Bath and Wells.

See also

 List of Grade I listed buildings in Taunton Deane
 List of towers in Somerset
 List of ecclesiastical parishes in the Diocese of Bath and Wells

References

External links

Buildings and structures completed in the 14th century
14th-century church buildings in England
Church of England church buildings in Taunton Deane
Grade I listed churches in Somerset
Grade I listed buildings in Taunton Deane